Cynthia Shilwatso Musungu (born 23 July 1999), known as Cynthia Shilwatso, is a Kenyan professional footballer who plays as a central attacking midfielder for Spanish Primera Nacional club EdF Logroño B and the Kenya women's national team. She also appears in the Spanish Primera División with the EdF Logroño first team.

International career
Shilwatso capped for Kenya at senior level during the 2018 Africa Women Cup of Nations qualification.

See also
List of Kenya women's international footballers

References

External links

1999 births
Living people
Footballers from Nairobi
Kenyan women's footballers
Women's association football midfielders
EdF Logroño B players
EdF Logroño players
Primera División (women) players
Kenya women's international footballers
Kenyan expatriate footballers
Kenyan expatriate sportspeople in Spain
Expatriate women's footballers in Spain